Fayfield is a residential village, located within the census-designated place of East York in York County, Pennsylvania, United States.

References

Springettsbury Township, York County, Pennsylvania
Unincorporated communities in York County, Pennsylvania
Unincorporated communities in Pennsylvania